Li Linfeng (Chinese: 李林峰; pinyin: Lǐ Línfēng; born 9 January 1988 in Haiyang) is a Chinese footballer.

Club career
Li was promoted to China League One club Qingdao Hailifeng first team squad in 2004 when he was just 16 years old. Although he was deemed as being a hot prospect for the future along with Yu Dabao, he was unable to establish himself within the club until 2008. In February 2010, Qingdao Hailifeng was banned from all future national matches organised by the Chinese Football Association for a match-fixing scandal. Li and his teammates turned out to be unattached players and he signed a contract with Chinese Super League side Qingdao Jonoon in March 2010. On 4 May 2011, he made his debut for Qingdao Jonoon in the first round of 2011 Chinese FA Cup which Qingdao lost to League One club Guangdong Sunray Cave 6–5 in the penalty shootout. He left Qingdao Jonoon at the end of 2015 season.

International career
Li was part of the China national under-17 football team to win the 2004 AFC U-17 Championship. He also played for China U-17s in the 2005 FIFA U-17 World Championship.

Career statistics
Statistics accurate as of match played 31 December 2020.

Honours

International
China under-17 national football team
 AFC U-17 Championship: 2004

References

External links

1988 births
Living people
People from Haiyang
Sportspeople from Yantai
Association football defenders
Chinese footballers
Footballers from Shandong
Qingdao Hainiu F.C. (1990) players
Chinese Super League players
China League One players